Chris Aldridge is a continuity announcer and newsreader for BBC Radio 4.

Biography
He grew up in Horsham, West Sussex.

After one term studying medicine at London Hospital Medical College, Aldridge studied mathematics at Bedford College (University of London). He joined the BBC in 1985, working in the production and archiving departments of Radio 3. He became a newsreader at Radio 5, then a Radio 4 staff announcer in 1995. He spent 2002 training new staff; then returned to the station as a senior announcer alongside Harriet Cass, taking over from Peter Donaldson. He sometimes reads and presents the Six O'Clock News on BBC Radio 4.

In 2021, Chris Aldridge stepped down from his role as senior announcer but remains on Radio 4 as a freelance announcer and newsreader.

On 8 September 2022, Aldridge announced the death of Queen Elizabeth II on BBC Radio.

He is married with two children; the family are members of their local Baptist Church. His hobbies include digital photography, playing the piano and jogging.

References

External links
 BBC profile, with photo
 BBC News article
What it’s like being a Radio 4 newsreader at Radio Times
 Photo on a 1985 Radio Sound Trainee Course
 Photo from a 1994 Trainee Audio Assistant course
 Chris reads through the morning papers in February 2005

Living people
People educated at The College of Richard Collyer
Alumni of Bedford College, London
Radio and television announcers
BBC newsreaders and journalists
BBC Radio 4
Year of birth missing (living people)